Ladian is a small village situated in district Shahid Bhagat Singh Nagar in Punjab, India. This village belonged to Late Master Sudhagar Singh Dhindsa and Late Kuljit Singh dhindsa, the prominent social reformer. Sant Amar Jot Partap Singh (Baba kar ji) arrived and blessed this village many times.

Geography 
It is in the Northwest part of India; a few hundred kilometres south of Kashmir and to the west of the Himalayan foothills of Punjab and Himachal Pradesh. On a clear day, the snow-clad peaks of the Dhauladhar range are visible in the distant horizon. It is also linked by Banga-Katarian Road with Amritsar-Chandigarh GT road and Amritsar-Anandpur Sahib route on NH-1.

Religious Places 
There are two Gurdwaras situated in Ladhian. Sant Shiva ji da Dera, Gurdwara Hari Sar, Mananhana, Hoshiarpur, Gurdwara Charan Kanwal Sahib, Peer Baba Gulami Shah, Shiv Mandir on Mukandpur Road are the frequently visited religious places within  from there.

Banking Facilities 

Most of Nationalised Government Sector Bank as well as Private Sector Bank is situated within  from here society in Katarian,  State Bank of India, Punjab National Bank, Bank of Baroda, Axis Bank, ICICI Bank, UCO Bank, Oriental Bank of Commerce, HDFC Bank, Allahabad Bank, Syndicate Bank, SBoP, Bank of India, Corporation Bank, IDBI Bank, etc.

References

Villages in Shaheed Bhagat Singh Nagar district